Transworld Identity is the idea that objects exist in multiple possible worlds.

See also
Identity (philosophy)
Modal realism

External links

Concepts in metaphysics